Abelardo Gamarra Rondó (August 31, 1852– July 9, 1924) was a Peruvian writer, composer and journalist. he gave the name of Marinera, a typical dance in Peru. He composed the first marinera song called La Concheperla.

Son of Manuel Guillermo Gamarra and Rondo Jacoba, began his studies at the Colegio San Nicolas, in his hometown, and, when he moved to Lima, he attended high school at the National College of Our Lady of Guadalupe between 1866 and 1870.

Works
The Rogue in over my head (1876).
Behind the Cross of the Devil (1877).
Lima Carnival Scenes (1879).
The novena of Rogue (1885).
Here come the Chileans (1886).
Traits Pen (1902).
Heresy (1902).
Something of Peru and many ragamuffins (1905).
Lima (1907).
One hundred years of life perdularia (1921).
Manco Capac (1923).

National University of San Marcos alumni
1850 births
1924 deaths
Peruvian composers
Peruvian male composers
Peruvian journalists
Male journalists
Peruvian male writers